The Hochstadl is a mountain of the Ybbstal Alps located in Styria, Austria, belonging to the Kräuterin karst massif. It is the highest summit of the Northern Lower Austria Alps.

Geography 
Administratively the mountain belongs to the Austrian state of Styria.

Access to the summit
The suggested route for the mountain starts from Dürradmer and reaches the top through the Kräuterinhütte (Kräuterin mountain hut) at 1,394 m.

References

External links 
 Article in German on bergkraxler.heimat.eu

One-thousanders of Austria
Mountains of the Alps
Mountains of Styria